Bhimanjaneya Yuddham (transl. The war between Bhima and Anjaneya) is a 1966 Indian mythological film directed by S. D. Lal. It was produced by T. Ramakoteswara Rao under the banner Mahalakshmi Movies. The film was shot in Telugu. The story is an adaptation of a small tale from Mahabharata where Bheema meets Anjaneya. Their conversation turns into a war.

Plot
In Treta Yuga, Anjaneya is supposed to be Vayu's son, while Bhima is Vayu's son in Dvapara Yuga. According to the epic Ramayana, Anjaneya is supposed to be immortal and devotee of Rama. According to Mahabharata, Bhima is strong and top in valour of his times. The plot of this movie runs around what happens when these two strong men head to war.

Sougandhika flowers are supposed to bloom and seen only at sunrise. Kubera uses these flowers to worship Lord Siva. Nalakoobara, Kubera's son, is fond of Soudamini, while Rambha loves him. To solve the problem, Narada calls for a dance competition between the two. When Soudamini wins, she is gifted one Sougandhika flower. Nalakoobara proposes Soudamini and tells the gifted flower is the symbol of their love and puts it into her hair. Kubera, realising that one flower is less in worship and that the flower is adorned in Soudamini's head, orders for her banishment. Rambha, taking advantage of the situation, throws Soudamini into river Ganga.

The flower in her head is washed away and is received by Droupadi while Soudamini reaches Anjaneya's hermitage. Droupadi asks Bhima to get more such flowers. Bhima gets them from Gandharva world with the help of Manimantha. On returning, Bhima is encountered by Anjaneya and in turn, Soudamini mistakes Bhima to have stolen the flowers. Anjaneya gives flowers to Soudamini and asks her to return to her world. While he fights Bhima. Soudamini reaches Gandharva world and is cursed by Kubera to be deformed into ugly one.

Ghatotkacha, son of Bhima, comes to rescue Bhima and a massive war occurs between Bhima and Anjaneya. With his magical powers, Ghatotkacha tries to cheat Anjaneya turning himself into Lord Sri Rama. Anjaneya believes that Rama came and releases Bhima from his Tail lock. Knowing the truth, Anjaneya gets angry and shows his Viswaroopam. Again the war continues and the universe shakes because of this causing cyclones, volcanoes etc.

Finally, Narada muni tells Kubera to take back his curse and turn Saudamini to normal, to give Sougandhika flowers to Bhima and with blessings of Anjaneya, do the marriage of Nalakoobara and Soudamini. On the other hand, Anjaneya and Bhima get to know that both Lord Sri Rama and Lord Sri Krishna are same. Rest of the story is about how Lord Krishna comes to the rescue and stops the war.

Cast
 Kantharao as Nalakoobara
 Rajasri as Soudamini
 Dandamudi Rajagopal as Bheema
 Kamineni Eswar Rao as Anjaneya
 Ramana Reddy
 Chalam as Narada
 Kaikala Satyanarayana as Ghatotkacha
 Mukkamala as Kubera
 Vijayasri
 S. Varalakshmi as Draupadi
 Veenavathi
 Haranath as Krishna and Rama
Vijayalalitha

Crew

 Director: S.D. Lal
 Producer: T. Rama Koteswara Rao
 Cinematographer: U. K. Ramachandra
 Editor: Govind Dinakar Joshi, B.S. Mani
 Composer: T. V. Raju
 Lyricist: C. Narayana Reddy, Thandra Subramanyam, Arudra, Rajasri
 Presented By: Donepudi Krishna Murthy
 Executive Producer: Donepudi Krishna Murthy
 Story: Thandra Subramanyam
 Dialogue: Thandra Subramanyam
 Singer: Ghantasala Venkateswara Rao, P. Susheela, L.R. Eswari, R. Sarojini, Venkatrao, Madhavapedhi Satyam, P. Sriram
 Art Director: Kudaravalli Nageswara Rao
 Dance Director: Chinni-Sampath

Soundtrack

Music was composed by T. V. Raju. Lyrics were written by C. Narayana Reddy, Thandra Subramanyam, Arudra and Rajasree.

References

1960s Telugu-language films
1966 films
Hindu mythological films
Films based on the Mahabharata
Films scored by T. V. Raju
Films directed by S. D. Lal